Yerriyong is a locality in the City of Shoalhaven in New South Wales, Australia. It lies about 17 km to the southwest of Nowra on the road to Nerriga and Canberra. It is largely made up of eucalyptus forest.

The name is believed to be of Aboriginal origin, as in Tharawal "Yerri" means "tooth" and "ong" is a common place name ending, so it is considered to relate to an initiation ceremony.

Yerriyong had a state school from 1885 to 1948. This was described as a "provisional school" (October 1882–April 1883), "public school" (1883–1895),  or "half-time school" (June–September 1895). It was replaced by Yerriyong Vale, which was  a "half-time school" (June–September 1895, 1906–1908 and 1914–1916) or a "provisional school" (1895–1906 and 1909–1913).

References

City of Shoalhaven